Ayyappanov  Waterfalls  ( അയ്യപ്പനോവ്‌ വെള്ളച്ചാട്ടം ) is a Athavanad  waterfall in the Athavanad village of Tirur taluk in Kerala, India. This is a seasonal waterfall. During Summer, water flow is low.

Notes and references

 Youth killed in Ayyappanov waterfalls | Kozhikode News - Times of India
 അയ്യപ്പനോവ് വെള്ളച്ചാട്ടം കാണാൻ വരുന്നവർ അപകടം ക്ഷണിച്ചുവരുത്തുന്നു
 കരിമ്പായിക്കോട്ട, പന്തീരായിരം ഏക്കർ വനം, നാടുകാണി ചുരം: കാഴ്ച്ചകളാൽ സമ്പന്നമാണ് മലപ്പുറം ജില്ല

External links
 IAPA Waterfalls
 Ayyappanov Waterfalls
 Wikimapia - Let's describe the whole world!
അയ്യപ്പനോവ് വെള്ളച്ചാട്ടം: പ്രകൃതിഭംഗി ആസ്വദിക്കാന്‍ സന്ദര്‍ശകപ്രവാഹം • Suprabhaatham
 Siraj Daily | The international Malayalam newspaper since 1984

Waterfalls of Kerala